Herbert Schibukat (27 October 1914 – June 1999) was a professional ice hockey player. He represented Germany in the 1936 Winter Olympics and 1952 Winter Olympics.

References

1914 births
1999 deaths
German ice hockey defencemen
Ice hockey players at the 1936 Winter Olympics
Ice hockey players at the 1952 Winter Olympics
Olympic ice hockey players of Germany
People from Kętrzyn
Sportspeople from Warmian-Masurian Voivodeship